One Minute Science is the debut studio album from the British industrial rock band Sunna.

The Album was released on 15 August 2000 in the United States on the Astralwerks label and on 6 November 2000 in the United Kingdom on the Melankolic label. Three singles were released for the album "O.D." "Power Struggle" and "I'm Not Trading".

Track listing 
All songs written and composed by Jon Harris and Ian MacLaren.

Release and reception
"One Minute Science" had mixed reviews.
Allmusic gave it 2.5 out 5 evaluating the voice of Jon Harris.
Exclaim! magazine described the album as the best and most powerful of the 21 century.
Kerrang magazine selected in 2001 Sunna "Best New Band".

Chart positions
Album

One Minute Science

References

2000 albums
Astralwerks albums
Sunna (band) albums
Virgin Records albums
Melankolic albums